UTC+06:00 is an identifier for a time offset from UTC of +06:00. This time is used in:

As standard time (year-round)
Principal cities: Almaty, Dhaka, Omsk, Thimphu, Astana, Bishkek

South Asia
Bangladesh – Bangladesh Standard Time
Bhutan – Bhutan Time

Indian Ocean 
United Kingdom
British Indian Ocean Territory / Mauritius (see Chagos Archipelago sovereignty dispute)
 Chagos Archipelago

Central Asia
Kazakhstan - Time in Kazakhstan
East Kazakhstan (including Oskemen, Ayagoz, Kurchatov, Ridder, Semey, Serebryansk, Shemonaikha, Zaysan and Zyryanovsk)
Except the provinces of Aktobe, Atyrau, Kyzylorda, Mangystau and West Kazakhstan
Kyrgyzstan – Kyrgyzstan Time (since August 12, 2005)

North Asia
Russia – Omsk Time
Siberian Federal District
Omsk Oblast

Antarctica
Some bases in Antarctica. See also Time in Antarctica
Australia
Australian Antarctic Territory
Russia
Vostok Station

Discrepancies between official UTC+06:00 and geographical UTC+06:00

Areas within UTC+06:00 longitudes using other time zones 
Using UTC+05:00

The very easternmost parts of Ural Federal District, Russia

Using UTC+05:30

Parts of India:

 Assam
 Meghalaya
 West Bengal
 Nagaland
 Manipur
 Tripura
 Mizoram
 Arunachal Pradesh
 Bihar
 Sikkim
 The northeast part of Andhra Pradesh
 The eastern part of Uttar Pradesh
 The northeast part of Chhattisgarh
 Most of Odisha
 Andaman and Nicobar Islands

Using UTC+05:45

Most of Nepal, with its capital city Kathmandu

Using UTC+06:30

Most of Myanmar, including the nation's capital Naypyidaw

Cocos (Keeling) Islands

Using UTC+07:00

The westernmost part of Indonesia including most of the province Aceh with its capital Banda Aceh

The westernmost part of Mongolia

Parts of Russia:

 A large part of Krasnoyarsk Krai
 Tuva
 Khakassia
 Altai Republic
 Altai Krai
 Kemerovo Oblast
A smaller parts of Novosibirsk Oblast 
parts of Tomsk Oblast

Using UTC+08:00

Western Mongolia

Parts of China:

 most of Tibet Autonomous Region
 most of Xinjiang Uyghur Autonomous Region (see also "Use in Xinjiang")

Areas outside UTC+06:00 longitudes using UTC+06:00 time

Areas between 52°30' E and 67°30' E ("physical" UTC+04:00) 
Parts of Kazakhstan:

 Kostanay
 A smaller parts of Turkistan
 western parts of Karaganda, Akmola, North Kazakhstan

Areas between 67°30′ E and 82°30′ E ("physical" UTC+05:00) 
Kyrgyzstan

British Indian Ocean Territory

Russia

 Omsk Oblast

Kazakhstan, most parts of its territories:

 Shymkent
 Turkistan
 Karaganda
 North Kazakhstan
 Akmola, with its nation's capital Nur-Sultan

Use in Xinjiang

In Xinjiang, China, this time offset is known as the Xinjiang Time or Urumqi Time.  It is set due to its geographical location in the westernmost part of China. It has been approved by Chinese authorities for civil purposes since February 1986, although the decision had been rejected by the local ethnic Han population and some Han-dominated regional governments. 

According to Human Rights Watch, a Uyghur man was arrested and detained by Chinese authorities in 2018 over "terrorist charges" for setting his watch to Xinjiang Time.

See also
Bangladesh Standard Time
Time in Antarctica – some stations use this time zone
Time in Russia
Xinjiang Time

References

External links

UTC offsets
Time in Kazakhstan
Time in China
Time in Bangladesh